Southend-on-Sea War Memorial, or Southend War Memorial, is a First World War memorial in Southend-on-Sea, Essex, on the east coast of England. Designed by architect Sir Edwin Lutyens, it is a Grade II* listed building.

Lutyens originally designed a cenotaph for Southend, following his example of the Cenotaph on Whitehall in London, arguably his most famous memorial. The memorial as-built is in the form of an obelisk flanked by stone flags and surrounded on three sides by a low screen wall. It is approached from the north by a set of six stone steps, similar to Lutyens' design for the North Eastern Railway War Memorial in York. The memorial was unveiled by Lord Lambourne, the Lord Lieutenant of Essex and dedicated by the Bishop of Colchester on 27 November 1921. It was designated a Grade II listed building in 1974 and upgraded to Grade II* in 2015, when Lutyens' memorials were recognised as a "national collection".

Background
In the aftermath of the First World War, thousands of war memorials were built across Britain. Amongst the most prominent designers of memorials was architect Sir Edwin Lutyens, described by Historic England as "the leading English architect of his generation". Lutyens designed the Cenotaph on Whitehall in London, which became the focus for the national Remembrance Sunday commemorations, as well as the Thiepval Memorial to the Missing—the largest British war memorial in the world—and the Stone of Remembrance, which appears in all large Commonwealth War Graves Commission cemeteries and in several of Lutyens' civic war memorials. The Southend memorial was the first of six of Lutyens' war memorials in England to include an obelisk; its design is similar to that of the North Eastern Railway War Memorial in York.

Lutyens originally planned a cenotaph for Southend, a design for which is held by the Royal Institute of British Architects. The design includes the cenotaph topped with an urn and flanked by lamps, broadly similar to the Royal Berkshire Regiment Cenotaph at Brock Barracks in Reading. This plan was abandoned in favour of the obelisk, which cost just over £5,500 (1921).

Design

It sits on a square base with a moulded cornice above a rectangular pedestal of six unequal-sized stones. The very bottom of the memorial protrudes from the screen walls, which surround the bottom of the obelisk on three sides to form a recess. The fourth side, the front (north-facing), is approached by a set of six low, broad stone steps which terminate a platform, and then two further steps at the base of the obelisk. Either side of the steps, the very front of the wall contains carved bases and bronze supports for flags. The only relief on the obelisk is a laurel wreath towards the base, in alignment with the tops of the painted stone flags on either side. The flags rise from the pedestal, flanking the laurel wreath; the Union Flag is on the west side while the White Ensign (flown by the Royal Navy) is on the east—a similar formation to Northampton War Memorial, the last of Lutyens' obelisks to be erected. The memorial is sited in a prominent position at the top of a cliff, with the Thames Estuary immediately behind (south). To the front of the monument is a garden, also designed by Lutyens. The words "LEST WE FORGET" are written into the grass in Portland stone directly in front of the memorial itself, in front and to the sides of which are paths and flower beds. It is separated from the cliff-top footpath to the south by a hedge.

The memorial contains an unusual amount of text. Above the flags and laurel wreath are the dates of the two world wars (the dates of the Second World War were added later):

below the laurel wreath is the dedication:

and at the bottom of the pedestal:

referring to a plaque in Prittlewell Priory, a local museum.

The last inscription on the memorial, at its very base, reads:

a quote from Laurence Binyon's poem "For the Fallen".

A metal plaque was affixed to the base (above the lowest inscription) in 1998, which reads:

A further plaque was added by the Association of Jewish Ex-Servicemen and Women, which reads:

History
The memorial was unveiled by Amelius Lockwood, 1st Baron Lambourne, the Lord Lieutenant of Essex, in front of a large crowd at a ceremony on 27 November 1921. It was dedicated by the Right Reverend Dr John Watts Ditchfield, Bishop of Chelmsford. Soldiers from D Company of the 6th battalion, Essex Regiment provided a guard of honour.

Southend-on-Sea War Memorial was designated a Grade II listed building on 23 August 1974. In November 2015, as part of commemorations for the centenary of the First World War, Lutyens' war memorials were recognised as a "national collection" and all of his free-standing memorials in England were listed or had their listing status reviewed and their National Heritage List for England list entries were updated and expanded. As part of this process, Southend's memorial was upgraded from Grade II to Grade II*.

See also

Grade II* listed buildings in Southend-on-Sea
Grade II* listed war memorials in England

References

Notes

Sources

1921 establishments in the United Kingdom
Buildings and structures completed in 1921
Grade II* listed monuments and memorials
Grade II* listed buildings in Essex
Monuments and memorials in Essex
Southend-on-Sea (town)
Works of Edwin Lutyens in England
War memorials by Edwin Lutyens
World War I memorials in England
World War II memorials in England